Joseph Andrew Aguirre (October 17, 1918 – July 13, 1985) was an American football end (which was an eligible receiver) in the National Football League (NFL) for the Washington Redskins, as well as for the Los Angeles Dons of the All-America Football Conference (AAFC).  He also spent time in the Canadian Football League with the Winnipeg Blue Bombers, Edmonton Eskimos, and Saskatchewan Roughriders.  In his time in the CFL, he won the Dave Dryburgh Memorial Trophy as the Western Interprovincial Football Union's Top Scorer in 1950 and again in 1954.  Aguirre played college football at Saint Mary's College of California and was drafted in the eleventh round of the 1941 NFL Draft.

References

External links
 

1918 births
1985 deaths
American football ends
Players of Canadian football from Utah
Edmonton Elks coaches
Edmonton Elks players
Los Angeles Dons players
Saint Mary's Gaels football players
Saskatchewan Roughriders players
Washington Redskins players
Winnipeg Blue Bombers players
Sportspeople from Ogden, Utah
People from Rock Springs, Wyoming
Players of American football from Utah